Simon Kaye (born 22 July 1935) is a British sound engineer. He won two Academy Awards for Best Sound and has been nominated for another two in the same category. He has worked on over 70 films since 1959.

Selected filmography
Kaye won two Academy Awards for Best Sound and has been nominated for two more:

Won
 Platoon (1986)
 The Last of the Mohicans (1992)

Nominated
 Reds (1981)
 Gandhi (1982)

References

External links

1935 births
Living people
British audio engineers
Best Sound BAFTA Award winners
Best Sound Mixing Academy Award winners
Film people from London